Xia Prefecture may refer to:

Xià Prefecture (夏州), a prefecture between the 5th and 13th centuries in modern Shaanxi and Inner Mongolia, China
Xiá Prefecture (硤州 or 峽州), a prefecture between the 6th and 14th centuries in modern Hubei, China

See also
Xia (disambiguation)